KVBN-LP (99.9 FM) is a low-power FM radio station licensed to Enid, Oklahoma, United States. The station is currently owned by Victory Bible Church, Inc.

History
The station was assigned the call sign KVBN-LP on March 13, 2014.

References

External links
 
 https://sites.google.com/site/vbcenid/radio-kvbn-99-9

VBN-LP
Radio stations established in 2014
2014 establishments in Oklahoma
VBN-LP
Enid, Oklahoma